Vinctifer is an extinct genus of prehistoric bony fish erected by David Starr Jordan in 1919.

Fossil record
This genus is known in the fossil record from the Late Jurassic (Kimmeridgian) to the Aptian stage of the Early Cretaceous epoch (age range: from 150.8 to 109.0 million years ago.). Fossils within this genus have been found in the Marizal, Romualdo and Missão Velha Formations of Brazil, Tlayua Formation of Mexico, Apón Formation of Venezuela and Ameghino Formation of Antarctica.

Species
Three species have been described:
 Vinctifer comptoni 
 Vinctifer ferrusquiai 
 Vinctifer longirostris

References

Late Jurassic fish
Early Cretaceous fish
Mesozoic fish of North America
Cretaceous Mexico
Fossils of Mexico
Prehistoric fish of South America
Cretaceous Brazil
Fossils of Brazil
Cretaceous Venezuela
Fossils of Venezuela
Prehistoric fish of Antarctica
Jurassic Antarctica
Fossils of Antarctica
Fossil taxa described in 1919
Taxa named by David Starr Jordan